Ima Lake is a lake in Lake County, in the U.S. state of Minnesota.

Ima Lake was named for the daughter of Newton Horace Winchell, a Minnesota geologist. However, some others in the area believe the lake was named for the mother of Eli the Prophet, a religious figure who was said to have visited the site in 1943.

See also
List of lakes in Minnesota

References

Lakes of Minnesota
Lakes of Lake County, Minnesota